Salaam  is an Indian Marathi language film directed and writer by Kiran Yadnyopavit and produced by Calyx Media and Entertainment. The film starring Girish Kulkarni, Kishor Kadam and Atisha Naik and Music by Rahul Ranade. The film was released on 2 May 2014.

Synopsis 
Raghunath, the son of a policeman, and Shankar, the son of an army officer, are best friends. However, both of them believe that their father's profession is more prestigious than the other.

Cast 
 Girish Kulkarni as Shankar
 Kishor Kadam as School Principal 
 Atisha Naik 
 Sanjay Khapre as Parshuram 
 Vivek Chabukswar as Raghu
 Abhishek Bharate as Sada
 Jyoti

Soundtrack

Critical response 
Salaam received positive reviews from critics. A reviewer from Loksatta wrote " Overall the amazing music of the movie, all the leading artistes and leading child actors have impressed the audience with their performances". Shripad Brahme of Maharashtra Times rated the film 3.5 out of 5 stars and wrote "Do watch 'Salaam' to throw off the masks of artificial life and see the pure, spring-like face inside you and salute the director for this discovery". A reviewer from  The Times of India rated the film 3 out of 5 stars and wrote "But where 'Salaam' stands out is in its beautiful portrayal of the good old childhood days. Watch this one to revive those".

References 

2014 films
2010s Marathi-language films
Indian drama films